The Folding Furniture Works Building, also known as the Lullabye Furniture Warehouse, is located in Stevens Point, Wisconsin. It was added to the National Register of Historic Places in 1993.

References

Buildings and structures in Portage County, Wisconsin
Industrial buildings and structures on the National Register of Historic Places in Wisconsin
Industrial buildings completed in 1931
Furniture companies of the United States
National Register of Historic Places in Portage County, Wisconsin